The South Africa women's national cricket team has represented South Africa in international women's cricket since 1960, when they hosted England, contesting four Test matches. Their next officially recognised series was against New Zealand, more than eleven years later. In 1977, they were excluded from competing in international sporting events, when the Commonwealth of Nations signed the Gleneagles Agreement as part of the international campaign against apartheid. Although the men's national team returned to international cricket in 1991, the women's team did not compete again until 1997, when they toured Ireland and England. Since then, the team has played regularly in One Day Internationals (ODI). The introduction of Twenty20 cricket in the early part of the 21st century has all but eliminated Test cricket from the woman's game. South Africa have played five Test matches since their return, and 71 Twenty20 Internationals (T20I) since their first such contest in 2007.

South Africa have played four different sides in women's Test cricket, with England their most frequent opponent, having faced them in six Tests. The only side that South Africa have beaten in Test cricket are the Netherlands, who South Africa have played once, in 2007. South Africa have similarly faced England more times than any other team in women's One Day International cricket, playing 33 matches. As such, England have recorded the most victories against South Africa, beating them 25 times. South Africa have beaten Pakistan more times than any other country, triumphing on twelve occasions against them. In women's T20Is, South Africa have as well played England the most, and lost to them on thirteen occasions. South Africa have recorded the most victories against Ireland, beating them in nine of their meetings.

Key
 M – Denotes the number of matches played
 W – Denotes the number of wins for South Africa against the listed opponent
 L – Denotes the number of losses for South Africa against the listed opponent
 T – Denotes the number of ties between South Africa and the listed opponent
 D – Denotes the number of draws between South Africa and the listed opponent
 NR – Denotes the number of no results between South Africa and the listed opponent
 Win% – Win percentage (in ODI and T20I cricket, a tie counts as half a win, and no results are disregarded)
 Loss% – Loss percentage
 Draw% – Draw percentage
 First – Year of the first match between South Africa and the listed opponent
 Last – Year of the latest match between South Africa and the listed opponent

Test cricket

One Day International

Twenty20 International

References

Cricket records and statistics
opponent